Primovula formosa is a species of sea snail in the family Ovulidae, the ovulids, cowry allies or false cowries.

Distribution
This species is distributed in East Asia, spanning north from Japan, both sides of Taiwan Straits, Thailand and East Kalimantan. Usually habitat at bottom of sea, on species of order Gorgonacea at depth of 15-18m.

References

 Fehse D. (2019). Contributions to the knowledge of the Ovulidae, XXVIII. On the identity of Ovulum formosum G. B. Sowerby II, 1848 and description of a new Cuspivolva. Conchylia. 50(1-4): 47-53.

External links
 Adams, A.; Reeve, L. (1848-1850). Mollusca. In A. Adams (ed.), The zoology of the voyage of H.M.S. Samarang, under the command of Captain Sir Edward Belcher, C.B., F.R.A.S., F.G.S., during the years 1843-1846. Reeve & Benham, London, x + 87 pp., 24 pls

Ovulidae
Gastropods described in 1848